Tan Xiao (born 10 March 1993) is a Chinese professional Go player.

He won the 11th RICOH Cup. In 2017, he defeated Park Yeong-hun to win the 11th Chunlan Cup, his first international individual title and was promoted to 9 dan.

Personal life

Tan married Jia Ganglu, who is also a professional Go player, in November 2017.

Promotion record

Career record
2007: 35 wins, 14 losses
2009: 33 wins, 12 losses
2010: 31 wins, 21 losses
2011: 23 wins, 9 losses

Titles and runners-up

References

1993 births
Living people
Chinese Go players
Sportspeople from Changchun
21st-century Chinese people